The 1984 VFL season was the 88th season of the Victorian Football League (VFL), the highest level senior Australian rules football competition in Victoria. The season featured twelve clubs, ran from 31 March until 29 September, and comprised a 22-game home-and-away season followed by a finals series featuring the top five clubs.

The premiership was won by the Essendon Football Club for the 13th time, after it defeated  by 24 points in the 1984 VFL Grand Final.

Night series
 defeated  13.11 (89) to 5.8 (38) in the final.

Premiership season

Round 1

|- bgcolor="#CCCCFF"
| Home team
| Home team score
| Away team
| Away team score
| Venue
| Crowd
| Date
|- bgcolor="#FFFFFF"
| 
| 17.22 (124)
| 
| 13.11 (89)
| Princes Park
| 13,888
| 31 March 1984
|- bgcolor="#FFFFFF"
| 
| 18.14 (122)
| 
| 11.17 (83)
| Western Oval
| 25,013
| 31 March 1984
|- bgcolor="#FFFFFF"
| 
| 18.12 (120)
| 
| 15.17 (107)
| Victoria Park
| 32,471
| 31 March 1984
|- bgcolor="#FFFFFF"
| 
| 23.10 (148)
| 
| 15.9 (99)
| Kardinia Park
| 22,260
| 31 March 1984
|- bgcolor="#FFFFFF"
| 
| 14.13 (97)
| 
| 19.20 (134)
| Moorabbin Oval
| 26,019
| 31 March 1984
|- bgcolor="#FFFFFF"
| 
| 9.8 (62)
| 
| 31.13 (199)
| VFL Park
| 36,504
| 31 March 1984

Round 2

|- bgcolor="#CCCCFF"
| Home team
| Home team score
| Away team
| Away team score
| Venue
| Crowd
| Date
|- bgcolor="#FFFFFF"
| 
| 16.14 (110)
| 
| 17.14 (116)
| Windy Hill
| 23,824
| 7 April 1984
|- bgcolor="#FFFFFF"
| 
| 22.17 (149)
| 
| 7.14 (56)
| Victoria Park
| 26,647
| 7 April 1984
|- bgcolor="#FFFFFF"
| 
| 15.17 (107)
| 
| 14.9 (93)
| MCG
| 25,004
| 7 April 1984
|- bgcolor="#FFFFFF"
| 
| 16.15 (111)
| 
| 18.13 (121)
| Junction Oval
| 22,202
| 7 April 1984
|- bgcolor="#FFFFFF"
| 
| 16.9 (105)
| 
| 9.11 (65)
| VFL Park
| 24,114
| 7 April 1984
|- bgcolor="#FFFFFF"
| 
| 16.16 (112)
| 
| 13.20 (98)
| SCG
| 8,131
| 8 April 1984

Round 3

|- bgcolor="#CCCCFF"
| Home team
| Home team score
| Away team
| Away team score
| Venue
| Crowd
| Date
|- bgcolor="#FFFFFF"
| 
| 18.8 (116)
| 
| 22.13 (145)
| Moorabbin Oval
| 15,127
| 14 April 1984
|- bgcolor="#FFFFFF"
| 
| 15.7 (97)
| 
| 19.12 (126)
| Princes Park
| 27,738
| 14 April 1984
|- bgcolor="#FFFFFF"
| 
| 20.12 (132)
| 
| 20.18 (138)
| MCG
| 25,557
| 14 April 1984
|- bgcolor="#FFFFFF"
| 
| 14.17 (101)
| 
| 25.14 (164)
| Arden Street Oval
| 14,174
| 14 April 1984
|- bgcolor="#FFFFFF"
| 
| 26.13 (169)
| 
| 16.10 (106)
| Windy Hill
| 28,101
| 14 April 1984
|- bgcolor="#FFFFFF"
| 
| 16.9 (105)
| 
| 22.19 (151)
| VFL Park
| 25,888
| 14 April 1984

Round 4

|- bgcolor="#CCCCFF"
| Home team
| Home team score
| Away team
| Away team score
| Venue
| Crowd
| Date
|- bgcolor="#FFFFFF"
| 
| 15.13 (103)
| 
| 17.4 (106)
| Victoria Park
| 22,519
| 21 April 1984
|- bgcolor="#FFFFFF"
| 
| 14.13 (97)
| 
| 23.13 (151)
| MCG
| 45,710
| 21 April 1984
|- bgcolor="#FFFFFF"
| 
| 14.7 (91)
| 
| 17.24 (126)
| VFL Park
| 31,535
| 21 April 1984
|- bgcolor="#FFFFFF"
| 
| 23.21 (159)
| 
| 14.15 (99)
| Princes Park
| 15,081
| 23 April 1984
|- bgcolor="#FFFFFF"
| 
| 9.11 (65)
| 
| 11.13 (79)
| Kardinia Park
| 26,574
| 23 April 1984
|- bgcolor="#FFFFFF"
| 
| 21.14 (140)
| 
| 9.16 (70)
| Junction Oval
| 20,280
| 23 April 1984

Round 5

|- bgcolor="#CCCCFF"
| Home team
| Home team score
| Away team
| Away team score
| Venue
| Crowd
| Date
|- bgcolor="#FFFFFF"
| 
| 12.14 (86)
| 
| 20.15 (135)
| MCG
| 55,141
| 25 April 1984
|- bgcolor="#FFFFFF"
| 
| 9.17 (71)
| 
| 10.16 (76)
| VFL Park
| 68,082
| 25 April 1984
|- bgcolor="#FFFFFF"
| 
| 13.16 (94)
| 
| 22.9 (141)
| Western Oval
| 19,988
| 28 April 1984
|- bgcolor="#FFFFFF"
| 
| 16.17 (113)
| 
| 14.14 (98)
| MCG
| 23,292
| 28 April 1984
|- bgcolor="#FFFFFF"
| 
| 10.11 (71)
| 
| 15.12 (102)
| Moorabbin Oval
| 16,892
| 28 April 1984
|- bgcolor="#FFFFFF"
| 
| 17.17 (119)
| 
| 15.14 (104)
| SCG
| 10,967
| 29 April 1984

Round 6

|- bgcolor="#CCCCFF"
| Home team
| Home team score
| Away team
| Away team score
| Venue
| Crowd
| Date
|- bgcolor="#FFFFFF"
| 
| 11.18 (84)
| 
| 11.11 (77)
| Western Oval
| 15,236
| 5 May 1984
|- bgcolor="#FFFFFF"
| 
| 15.18 (108)
| 
| 12.15 (87)
| Victoria Park
| 25,156
| 5 May 1984
|- bgcolor="#FFFFFF"
| 
| 15.14 (104)
| 
| 13.12 (90)
| Princes Park
| 18,513
| 5 May 1984
|- bgcolor="#FFFFFF"
| 
| 23.10 (148)
| 
| 12.13 (85)
| MCG
| 27,685
| 5 May 1984
|- bgcolor="#FFFFFF"
| 
| 13.15 (93)
| 
| 22.12 (144)
| Junction Oval
| 20,270
| 5 May 1984
|- bgcolor="#FFFFFF"
| 
| 11.15 (81)
| 
| 17.18 (120)
| VFL Park
| 31,259
| 5 May 1984

Round 7

|- bgcolor="#CCCCFF"
| Home team
| Home team score
| Away team
| Away team score
| Venue
| Crowd
| Date
|- bgcolor="#FFFFFF"
| 
| 12.10 (82)
| 
| 16.8 (104)
| Windy Hill
| 21,196
| 12 May 1984
|- bgcolor="#FFFFFF"
| 
| 20.15 (135)
| 
| 16.8 (104)
| Princes Park
| 14,189
| 12 May 1984
|- bgcolor="#FFFFFF"
| 
| 11.17 (83)
| 
| 19.14 (128)
| Kardinia Park
| 25,876
| 12 May 1984
|- bgcolor="#FFFFFF"
| 
| 16.9 (105)
| 
| 18.14 (122)
| MCG
| 41,073
| 12 May 1984
|- bgcolor="#FFFFFF"
| 
| 14.17 (101)
| 
| 22.16 (148)
| VFL Park
| 18,066
| 12 May 1984
|- bgcolor="#FFFFFF"
| 
| 17.20 (122)
| 
| 18.21 (129)
| SCG
| 14,794
| 13 May 1984

Round 8

|- bgcolor="#CCCCFF"
| Home team
| Home team score
| Away team
| Away team score
| Venue
| Crowd
| Date
|- bgcolor="#FFFFFF"
| 
| 18.19 (127)
| 
| 19.20 (134)
| Arden Street Oval
| 10,759
| 19 May 1984
|- bgcolor="#FFFFFF"
| 
| 12.9 (81)
| 
| 13.14 (92)
| Junction Oval
| 12,712
| 19 May 1984
|- bgcolor="#FFFFFF"
| 
| 12.11 (83)
| 
| 23.13 (151)
| Princes Park
| 31,946
| 19 May 1984
|- bgcolor="#FFFFFF"
| 
| 13.11 (89)
| 
| 9.17 (71)
| Moorabbin Oval
| 18,100
| 19 May 1984
|- bgcolor="#FFFFFF"
| 
| 15.19 (109)
| 
| 13.17 (95)
| MCG
| 70,889
| 19 May 1984
|- bgcolor="#FFFFFF"
| 
| 19.19 (133)
| 
| 14.6 (90)
| VFL Park
| 39,962
| 19 May 1984

Round 9

|- bgcolor="#CCCCFF"
| Home team
| Home team score
| Away team
| Away team score
| Venue
| Crowd
| Date
|- bgcolor="#FFFFFF"
| 
| 24.8 (152)
| 
| 12.16 (88)
| MCG
| 30,402
| 26 May 1984
|- bgcolor="#FFFFFF"
| 
| 21.17 (143)
| 
| 13.8 (86)
| Princes Park
| 12,975
| 26 May 1984
|- bgcolor="#FFFFFF"
| 
| 15.19 (109)
| 
| 11.16 (82)
| Victoria Park
| 25,578
| 26 May 1984
|- bgcolor="#FFFFFF"
| 
| 16.17 (113)
| 
| 9.12 (66)
| Windy Hill
| 27,312
| 26 May 1984
|- bgcolor="#FFFFFF"
| 
| 11.15 (81)
| 
| 23.21 (159)
| VFL Park
| 20,056
| 26 May 1984
|- bgcolor="#FFFFFF"
| 
| 16.15 (111)
| 
| 7.27 (69)
| SCG
| 13,572
| 27 May 1984

Round 10

|- bgcolor="#CCCCFF"
| Home team
| Home team score
| Away team
| Away team score
| Venue
| Crowd
| Date
|- bgcolor="#FFFFFF"
| 
| 15.13 (103)
| 
| 11.10 (76)
| MCG
| 43,712
| 2 June 1984
|- bgcolor="#FFFFFF"
| 
| 17.11 (113)
| 
| 11.19 (85)
| Kardinia Park
| 14,290
| 2 June 1984
|- bgcolor="#FFFFFF"
| 
| 15.16 (106)
| 
| 16.12 (108)
| Arden Street Oval
| 16,690
| 2 June 1984
|- bgcolor="#FFFFFF"
| 
| 15.10 (100)
| 
| 13.17 (95)
| Western Oval
| 25,618
| 2 June 1984
|- bgcolor="#FFFFFF"
| 
| 11.17 (83)
| 
| 22.15 (147)
| VFL Park
| 20,618
| 2 June 1984
|- bgcolor="#FFFFFF"
| 
| 12.15 (87)
| 
| 20.19 (139)
| SCG
| 25,062
| 3 June 1984

Round 11

|- bgcolor="#CCCCFF"
| Home team
| Home team score
| Away team
| Away team score
| Venue
| Crowd
| Date
|- bgcolor="#FFFFFF"
| 
| 20.15 (135)
| 
| 14.10 (94)
| Windy Hill
| 21,739
| 9 June 1984
|- bgcolor="#FFFFFF"
| 
| 13.13 (91)
| 
| 19.13 (127)
| Moorabbin Oval
| 20,080
| 9 June 1984
|- bgcolor="#FFFFFF"
| 
| 16.15 (111)
| 
| 17.21 (123)
| MCG
| 38,183
| 9 June 1984
|- bgcolor="#FFFFFF"
| 
| 25.16 (166)
| 
| 23.14 (152)
| Junction Oval
| 14,607
| 11 June 1984
|- bgcolor="#FFFFFF"
| 
| 22.11 (143)
| 
| 16.13 (109)
| Princes Park
| 29,982
| 11 June 1984
|- bgcolor="#FFFFFF"
| 
| 14.8 (92)
| 
| 18.16 (124)
| VFL Park
| 62,339
| 11 June 1984

Round 12

|- bgcolor="#CCCCFF"
| Home team
| Home team score
| Away team
| Away team score
| Venue
| Crowd
| Date
|- bgcolor="#FFFFFF"
| 
| 14.10 (94)
| 
| 16.14 (110)
| Arden Street Oval
| 10,242
| 16 June 1984
|- bgcolor="#FFFFFF"
| 
| 21.17 (143)
| 
| 5.16 (46)
| MCG
| 24,871
| 16 June 1984
|- bgcolor="#FFFFFF"
| 
| 13.11 (89)
| 
| 10.13 (73)
| Western Oval
| 16,233
| 16 June 1984
|- bgcolor="#FFFFFF"
| 
| 12.21 (93)
| 
| 6.10 (46)
| Princes Park
| 25,772
| 16 June 1984
|- bgcolor="#FFFFFF"
| 
| 11.6 (72)
| 
| 11.12 (78)
| Moorabbin Oval
| 17,648
| 16 June 1984
|- bgcolor="#FFFFFF"
| 
| 9.13 (67)
| 
| 10.12 (72)
| VFL Park
| 24,639
| 16 June 1984

Round 13

|- bgcolor="#CCCCFF"
| Home team
| Home team score
| Away team
| Away team score
| Venue
| Crowd
| Date
|- bgcolor="#FFFFFF"
| 
| 13.12 (90)
| 
| 15.17 (107)
| Princes Park
| 20,416
| 23 June 1984
|- bgcolor="#FFFFFF"
| 
| 12.17 (89)
| 
| 19.9 (123)
| Victoria Park
| 32,701
| 23 June 1984
|- bgcolor="#FFFFFF"
| 
| 11.15 (81)
| 
| 14.14 (98)
| MCG
| 26,707
| 23 June 1984
|- bgcolor="#FFFFFF"
| 
| 4.17 (41)
| 
| 10.18 (78)
| Kardinia Park
| 21,769
| 23 June 1984
|- bgcolor="#FFFFFF"
| 
| 11.11 (77)
| 
| 9.8 (62)
| VFL Park
| 12,945
| 23 June 1984
|- bgcolor="#FFFFFF"
| 
| 15.11 (101)
| 
| 19.12 (126)
| SCG
| 10,392
| 24 June 1984

Round 14

|- bgcolor="#CCCCFF"
| Home team
| Home team score
| Away team
| Away team score
| Venue
| Crowd
| Date
|- bgcolor="#FFFFFF"
| 
| 23.14 (152)
| 
| 4.13 (37)
| Princes Park
| 21,643
| 30 June 1984
|- bgcolor="#FFFFFF"
| 
| 4.6 (30)
| 
| 19.20 (134)
| Moorabbin Oval
| 12,523
| 30 June 1984
|- bgcolor="#FFFFFF"
| 
| 16.11 (107)
| 
| 19.11 (125)
| MCG
| 11,050
| 30 June 1984
|- bgcolor="#FFFFFF"
| 
| 13.13 (91)
| 
| 11.11 (77)
| Western Oval
| 14,473
| 30 June 1984
|- bgcolor="#FFFFFF"
| 
| 14.15 (99)
| 
| 7.14 (56)
| VFL Park
| 46,753
| 30 June 1984
|- bgcolor="#FFFFFF"
| 
| 14.16 (100)
| 
| 19.17 (131)
| SCG
| 14,917
| 1 July 1984

Round 15

|- bgcolor="#CCCCFF"
| Home team
| Home team score
| Away team
| Away team score
| Venue
| Crowd
| Date
|- bgcolor="#FFFFFF"
| 
| 18.9 (117)
| 
| 10.14 (74)
| MCG
| 17,204
| 7 July 1984
|- bgcolor="#FFFFFF"
| 
| 15.12 (102)
| 
| 13.11 (89)
| Kardinia Park
| 10,861
| 7 July 1984
|- bgcolor="#FFFFFF"
| 
| 9.14 (68)
| 
| 14.12 (96)
| Junction Oval
| 8,368
| 7 July 1984
|- bgcolor="#FFFFFF"
| 
| 14.10 (94)
| 
| 7.19 (61)
| Windy Hill
| 16,993
| 7 July 1984
|- bgcolor="#FFFFFF"
| 
| 16.14 (110)
| 
| 10.16 (76)
| Princes Park
| 11,169
| 7 July 1984
|- bgcolor="#FFFFFF"
| 
| 9.16 (70)
| 
| 14.13 (97)
| VFL Park
| 48,218
| 7 July 1984

Round 16

|- bgcolor="#CCCCFF"
| Home team
| Home team score
| Away team
| Away team score
| Venue
| Crowd
| Date
|- bgcolor="#FFFFFF"
| 
| 20.7 (127)
| 
| 9.12 (66)
| Windy Hill
| 17,749
| 14 July 1984
|- bgcolor="#FFFFFF"
| 
| 14.13 (97)
| 
| 28.17 (185)
| VFL Park
| 27,274
| 14 July 1984
|- bgcolor="#FFFFFF"
| 
| 16.17 (113)
| 
| 12.15 (87)
| SCG
| 10,644
| 15 July 1984
|- bgcolor="#FFFFFF"
| 
| 20.10 (130)
| 
| 15.18 (108)
| Kardinia Park
| 21,448
| 21 July 1984
|- bgcolor="#FFFFFF"
| 
| 14.17 (101)
| 
| 21.20 (146)
| MCG
| 27,181
| 21 July 1984
|- bgcolor="#FFFFFF"
| 
| 16.9 (105)
| 
| 13.6 (84)
| Moorabbin Oval
| 17,102
| 21 July 1984

Round 17

|- bgcolor="#CCCCFF"
| Home team
| Home team score
| Away team
| Away team score
| Venue
| Crowd
| Date
|- bgcolor="#FFFFFF"
| 
| 12.19 (91)
| 
| 3.10 (28)
| MCG
| 13,041
| 28 July 1984
|- bgcolor="#FFFFFF"
| 
| 11.11 (77)
| 
| 10.7 (67)
| Junction Oval
| 6,920
| 28 July 1984
|- bgcolor="#FFFFFF"
| 
| 6.19 (55)
| 
| 4.5 (29)
| Victoria Park
| 22,306
| 28 July 1984
|- bgcolor="#FFFFFF"
| 
| 7.10 (52)
| 
| 3.8 (26)
| Princes Park
| 17,847
| 28 July 1984
|- bgcolor="#FFFFFF"
| 
| 3.14 (32)
| 
| 4.10 (34)
| Western Oval
| 16,771
| 28 July 1984
|- bgcolor="#FFFFFF"
| 
| 5.12 (42)
| 
| 5.14 (44)
| VFL Park
| 12,643
| 28 July 1984

Round 18

|- bgcolor="#CCCCFF"
| Home team
| Home team score
| Away team
| Away team score
| Venue
| Crowd
| Date
|- bgcolor="#FFFFFF"
| 
| 16.16 (112)
| 
| 11.13 (79)
| Western Oval
| 13,356
| 4 August 1984
|- bgcolor="#FFFFFF"
| 
| 19.14 (128)
| 
| 12.20 (92)
| Victoria Park
| 24,067
| 4 August 1984
|- bgcolor="#FFFFFF"
| 
| 17.18 (120)
| 
| 22.20 (152)
| MCG
| 20,236
| 4 August 1984
|- bgcolor="#FFFFFF"
| 
| 21.14 (140)
| 
| 16.12 (108)
| Princes Park
| 23,968
| 4 August 1984
|- bgcolor="#FFFFFF"
| 
| 12.17 (89)
| 
| 19.22 (136)
| VFL Park
| 31,675
| 4 August 1984
|- bgcolor="#FFFFFF"
| 
| 17.6 (108)
| 
| 18.15 (123)
| SCG
| 8,538
| 5 August 1984

Round 19

|- bgcolor="#CCCCFF"
| Home team
| Home team score
| Away team
| Away team score
| Venue
| Crowd
| Date
|- bgcolor="#FFFFFF"
| 
| 16.17 (113)
| 
| 14.8 (92)
| Kardinia Park
| 10,752
| 11 August 1984
|- bgcolor="#FFFFFF"
| 
| 12.18 (90)
| 
| 15.12 (102)
| Princes Park
| 26,863
| 11 August 1984
|- bgcolor="#FFFFFF"
| 
| 11.15 (81)
| 
| 10.14 (74)
| Moorabbin Oval
| 11,025
| 11 August 1984
|- bgcolor="#FFFFFF"
| 
| 17.20 (122)
| 
| 7.9 (51)
| Arden Street Oval
| 8,274
| 11 August 1984
|- bgcolor="#FFFFFF"
| 
| 15.13 (103)
| 
| 20.15 (135)
| MCG
| 18,019
| 11 August 1984
|- bgcolor="#FFFFFF"
| 
| 14.19 (103)
| 
| 9.7 (61)
| VFL Park
| 25,656
| 11 August 1984

Round 20

|- bgcolor="#CCCCFF"
| Home team
| Home team score
| Away team
| Away team score
| Venue
| Crowd
| Date
|- bgcolor="#FFFFFF"
| 
| 20.11 (131)
| 
| 14.9 (93)
| Junction Oval
| 9,518
| 18 August 1984
|- bgcolor="#FFFFFF"
| 
| 22.6 (138)
| 
| 13.5 (83)
| Windy Hill
| 13,882
| 18 August 1984
|- bgcolor="#FFFFFF"
| 
| 16.15 (111)
| 
| 14.14 (98)
| Princes Park
| 15,463
| 18 August 1984
|- bgcolor="#FFFFFF"
| 
| 9.17 (71)
| 
| 15.13 (103)
| MCG
| 31,847
| 18 August 1984
|- bgcolor="#FFFFFF"
| 
| 12.13 (85)
| 
| 9.11 (65)
| VFL Park
| 13,013
| 18 August 1984
|- bgcolor="#FFFFFF"
| 
| 11.19 (85)
| 
| 25.24 (174)
| SCG
| 8,276
| 19 August 1984

Round 21

|- bgcolor="#CCCCFF"
| Home team
| Home team score
| Away team
| Away team score
| Venue
| Crowd
| Date
|- bgcolor="#FFFFFF"
| 
| 14.29 (113)
| 
| 9.9 (63)
| Kardinia Park
| 15,926
| 25 August 1984
|- bgcolor="#FFFFFF"
| 
| 15.21 (111)
| 
| 26.9 (165)
| MCG
| 20,086
| 25 August 1984
|- bgcolor="#FFFFFF"
| 
| 16.23 (119)
| 
| 15.14 (104)
| Princes Park
| 22,031
| 25 August 1984
|- bgcolor="#FFFFFF"
| 
| 14.9 (93)
| 
| 7.16 (58)
| Western Oval
| 20,890
| 25 August 1984
|- bgcolor="#FFFFFF"
| 
| 14.16 (100)
| 
| 9.8 (62)
| VFL Park
| 14,079
| 25 August 1984
|- bgcolor="#FFFFFF"
| 
| 23.17 (155)
| 
| 14.15 (99)
| SCG
| 12,173
| 26 August 1984

Round 22

|- bgcolor="#CCCCFF"
| Home team
| Home team score
| Away team
| Away team score
| Venue
| Crowd
| Date
|- bgcolor="#FFFFFF"
| 
| 24.20 (164)
| 
| 15.17 (107)
| Junction Oval
| 15,156
| 1 September 1984
|- bgcolor="#FFFFFF"
| 
| 27.7 (169)
| 
| 19.17 (131)
| Windy Hill
| 21,002
| 1 September 1984
|- bgcolor="#FFFFFF"
| 
| 16.18 (114)
| 
| 9.17 (71)
| Victoria Park
| 32,023
| 1 September 1984
|- bgcolor="#FFFFFF"
| 
| 20.19 (139)
| 
| 15.13 (103)
| Princes Park
| 20,319
| 1 September 1984
|- bgcolor="#FFFFFF"
| 
| 21.19 (145)
| 
| 18.9 (117)
| MCG
| 21,565
| 1 September 1984
|- bgcolor="#FFFFFF"
| 
| 25.14 (164)
| 
| 14.11 (95)
| VFL Park
| 31,609
| 1 September 1984

Ladder

Finals series

Week one

Week two

Week three

Week four

Awards
 The Brownlow Medal was awarded to Peter Moore of Melbourne.
 The Coleman Medal was awarded to Bernie Quinlan of Fitzroy.
 The VFL Players Association MVP Award, now known as the Leigh Matthews Trophy, was awarded to Russell Greene of Hawthorn.
 The Norm Smith Medal was awarded to Billy Duckworth of Essendon.
 The wooden spoon was "awarded" to St Kilda.
 North Melbourne 17.19 (121) defeated Richmond 7.11 (53) in the under 19's grand final, held as a curtain-raiser to the Reserves Grand final on 29 September at the Melbourne Cricket Ground.
 Melbourne 11.15 (81) defeated Carlton 6.9 (45) in the Reserves Grand final, held as a curtain-raiser to the grand final on 29 September at the Melbourne Cricket Ground.

Notable events
 Fitzroy became the only side to make the finals after winning only one of its first nine games.
 Essendon's 133-point win over Collingwood in the Preliminary Final is the largest win in any VFL/AFL final and the first 100-point loss by Collingwood since 1943 when they were depleted by war.
 In Round 17, shocking weather saw the lowest aggregate score for a round since 1961, with a combined total of only 577 points or an approximate average score of 6.12 (48).

See also
 McIntyre "final five" system

References

Bibliography
 Stephen Rodgers: Every Game Ever Played VFL/AFL Results 1897–1991 3rd Edition 1992. Penguin Books Australia .

External links
 1984 Season – AFL Tables

1984
VFL season